Beschi is a surname. Notable people with the surname include:

Constanzo Beschi (1680–1742), Italian Jesuit priest
Francesco Beschi (born 1951), Italian Roman Catholic bishop

Italian-language surnames